The Bridge at 13th Street, also known as the Wooden Bridge, is a historic bridge in St. Francisville, Illinois that carries 13th Street across a former railroad right-of way. The bridge was built in 1909 as a safer crossing of the railroad; at the time, the railroad was operated by the Cairo, Vincennes and Chicago Railway, a division of the Cleveland, Cincinnati, Chicago and St. Louis Railway (Big Four). The railroad paid for the bridge according to its contract with the city, which had passed a city council resolution compelling the railroad to fulfill this portion of the contract two years earlier. The bridge is a beam bridge built partly of timber and partly of steel, though it is possible that its steel beam was added after its completion.

The bridge was added to the National Register of Historic Places on April 26, 2016.

References

National Register of Historic Places in Lawrence County, Illinois
Road bridges on the National Register of Historic Places in Illinois
Bridges completed in 1909
Wooden bridges in Illinois
Transportation buildings and structures in Lawrence County, Illinois
Beam bridges in the United States